McLay Glacier is a glacier flowing southeast into Nursery Glacier, in the Churchill Mountains of Antarctica. Mount Durnford, Mount Stewart and Mount Liard flank the north and Turk Peak and Bradshaw Peak flank the south. It was named in honor of the Honourable Sir James Kenneth McLay, KNZM QSO, who was the former Minister of Justice, Attorney-General and Deputy Prime Minister of New Zealand. He held the position of New Zealand's Whaling Commissioner for 9 years, during which time he fought for the Southern Ocean Whale Sanctuary, and opposed scientific whaling.

References

Glaciers of Oates Land